Beit Gamliel (lit. House of Gamliel) is a religious moshav in central Israel. Located south-east of Yavne, it falls under the jurisdiction of Hevel Yavne Regional Council.

History
The moshav was established in 1949 by Holocaust survivors from Romania, Czechoslovakia, Hungary and North Africa.

Notable residents
Yehuda Barkan
Rachel Azaria
Matan Kahana

References

External links
Official website 

Czech-Jewish culture in Israel
Hungarian-Jewish culture in Israel
Moshavim
North African-Jewish culture in Israel
Slovak-Jewish culture in Israel
Religious Israeli communities
Populated places established in 1949
Populated places in Central District (Israel)
1949 establishments in Israel
Romanian-Jewish culture in Israel